Paula Jacklin (24 March 1957) is an English darts player who competes in World Darts Federation (WDF) events.

World Championship results

BDO/WDF
 2015: First round (lost to Aileen de Graaf 0–2)
 2016: First round (lost to Lisa Ashton 0–2)
 2018: First round (lost to Aileen de Graaf 0–2)
 2019: First round (lost to Aileen de Graaf 0–2)
 2020: First round (lost to Lisa Ashton 0–2)
 2022: First round (lost to Rhian O'Sullivan 0–2)
 2023:

References

External links
 Paula Jacklin on Darts Database

Living people
English darts players
British Darts Organisation players
1957 births
Female darts players